This was the ninth time India participating in Commonwealth Games India ranked 6th in the medal tally.

Medalists

Gold Medalists

Silver medalists

Bronze medalists

References

Nations at the 1982 Commonwealth Games
India at the Commonwealth Games
1982 in Indian sport